Holt High School is a public secondary school in Holt, Michigan, United States. It serves grades 9–12 for the Holt Public Schools.

Athletics
The school fields 23 varsity athletic teams and competes in interscholastic sports in the Capital Area Activities Conference. Holt High School's team nickname is The Rams. The team colors are brown and gold. The team used to be named The Ramblers but was shorted to The Rams at an unknown time.

Fall sports:
Boys cross-country,
Girls cross-country,
Equestrian,
Football,
Girls golf,
Boys soccer,
Girls swimming,
Boys tennis,
Girls volleyball, and
Boys water polo.

Winter sports:
Boys basketball,
Bowling,
Dance,
Gymnastics,
Hockey,
Boys swimming,
Wrestling, and
Girls basketball.

Spring sports:
Baseball,
Boys golf,
Boys lacrosse,
Girls lacrosse,
Girls soccer,
Softball,
Girls tennis,
Track and field, and
Girls Water Polo.

Holt has won a total of 8 state championships in the sports of Girls Gymnastics (2007), Boys Basketball (2005), Wrestling (1971, 1996, 1997, 2008), Girls Track and Field (1976), and Girls Bowling (2010).

They have also been State Runners-Up on 5 different occasions in the sports: Boys Cross Country (1979), Boys Soccer (2009), Football (1995, 1971), and Wrestling (1979, 2009).

References

External links

Holt High School web site
School district web site

Public high schools in Michigan
Schools in Ingham County, Michigan
2003 establishments in Michigan
Educational institutions established in 2003